Tawag ng Tanghalan (abbreviated as TNT) is a Philippine amateur singing competition currently airing as a segment of the noon time program, It's Showtime on ABS-CBN. It airs on the Kapamilya Channel, a simulcast on Jeepney TV (encore telecast) from A2Z and TV5, as well as on online streaming platforms such as Facebook and YouTube via Showtime Online Ü and Kapamilya Online Live every Monday to Saturday. Dubbed as "Your All-Time Favorite Search for Outstanding Amateur Talents", the competition is open to Filipino contestants from Metro Manila, Luzon, Visayas, Mindanao and overseas.

The show first aired on January 2, 2016, and was successfully continuing its fame for the next five regular seasons: one kids edition, one celebrity edition and one all-star edition. There have been eight winners to date: Noven Belleza, Jhon Clyd Talili, Janine Berdin, Elaine Duran, Ethel Booba Mark Michael Garcia, JM Yosures, and Reiven Umali.

History

First and second iterations (1953–1988) 
Tawag ng Tanghalan (originally known as Purico Amateur Hour) debuted as a radio talent search program on DZBB-AM in 1953. It was later aired on television DZAQ-TV (now DWWX-TV) until 1972 following the declaration of Martial Law by former President Ferdinand Marcos. The second incarnation of Tawag ng Tanghalan and originally hosted by Frankie Evangelista, Danny Javier and Nanette Inventor, it was revived from the following relaunch of ABS-CBN from January 11, 1987 to October 30, 1988.

Noted OPM artists like Armand Panlilio, Nora Aunor, Novo Bono Jr., Pepe Pimentel, Edgar Mortiz and Diomedes Maturan were among the winners of the original program.

Third iteration (2016–present) 
After 28 years of Singing Talent Competition of Philippine Television since 1987, Tawag ng Tanghalan returned as a daily segment on ABS-CBN's noon time program It's Showtime.

Format 
The regular season is divided into four quarters, with the semifinals taking place at the end of each quarter. The two semifinalists with the highest scores from each quarter, along with winners from the wildcard rounds, move on to compete in the grand finals.

Daily rounds

Elimination round 
From 1987–1988 and since 2016, Daily contenders from Metro Manila (NCR), Luzon, Visayas, and Mindanao in over the Philippines perform in front of a live audience and are scored by a panel of judges (or hurados) composed of a Head Judge (called as Punong Hurado) and four regular judges. For the first two regular seasons, and kids edition, the judging criteria were as follows:

 Tone quality (40%)
 Voice projection (30%)
 Stage impact (20%)
 Intonation (10%)

In the following seasons, the judging criteria were modified:

 Voice quality (50%)
 Overall performance (50%)

The first criterion includes intonation, enunciation, voice projection and technique. The second criterion comprises timing, mastery of lyrics, stage presence and audience impact.

If the contender goes out-of-tune, the Punong Hurado has the option to signal a gong master positioned on the right hand side of the stage to hit the gong three times. The Punong Hurado can signal when the gong master should hit the gong by raising his/her hand, and the moments leading up to the ringing of the gong are indicated by a finger warning signal, thereby stopping the performance and eliminating the contender, à la-Major Bowes Amateur Hour. This mechanic was omitted in the kids' edition presumably to prevent the judges from upsetting young contenders, instead relying solely on the judges' verdict and overall score to determine the winner. In the fourth season, the four regular judges have also been given the power to gong a contender if they all press their buzzers.

In Celebrity Champions, the winner in the elimination round automatically advances to the semifinals.

In the fourth season of the New Normal, the following contenders are to perform in front of the stage for two rounds, but the audiences are not allowed in the studio due to the pandemic. The two contenders from Metro Manila and Luzon (from their other barangay) perform a song without a live audience, the contender with the highest and lowest combined scores is advanced to the next round, and if the two contenders receive the same highest combined scores will advance again to the next round, and the contender will pick the songs and then perform again.

Face-off round 
The daily contender with the highest score moves on to the face-off round to challenge the defending champion and attempt to steal the golden microphone. The winner in the face-off round gets to claim the golden microphone and defend their title against the next winning daily contender. Defending champions who achieve a five-time winning streak advance as a semifinalist, but may opt to continue their winning streak up to ten. Those who continue and achieve ten straight wins become a Tawag ng Tanghalan record holder and get to select a bonus prize. In Kids, this rule was reduced to five straight wins.

In the fourth season, a defending champion may advance to the semifinals with four straight wins.

The defending champion receives  for each win.

Week-long Finals 
In the fourth season of the New Normal, the daily contenders will forward to the Weekly Finals and determine the one or two contenders moving on to the Quarter Finals, but it is the same criteria for judging in two rounds. The weekly finalists will choose the songs and test their singing by the mentor judge at home, and perform in front of the stage. After the first round, the two weekly finalists will pick songs and then perform again.

The two weekly finalists with the highest combined scores advances to the second round, while the other finalists receive a consolation prize of ₱5,000, and the winning weekly finalist receives ₱25,000 and advances to the Quarter Finals and received the medical kits, negosyo package, mobile devices, and other packages and devices, while the other finalist receives a consolation prize of ₱10,000.

Month-long Quarter Finals 
In the fourth season of the New Normal, the Quarter Finalists will compete and perform a song based on a theme for each week but it is the same criteria for judging. The two (or three) Quarter Finalists with the highest combined scores at the end of the six days (per week) move on to the semifinals and receive ₱50,000, while the other finalists for the consolation prize of ₱10,000. The judges may still gong a contender in this round.

In the fifth season of the New Normal, Tawag ng Tanghalan introduced the new mechanics, "Instant Spotlight", the quarter finalists who obtained the highest combined scores on Mondays and Wednesdays and will be safe from eliminations on Tuesdays and Thursdays.

Semifinals

Quarter Semifinals 
The semifinalists perform a song based on a theme for each day. The semifinalists perform a song based on a theme for each day. Competitors are scored through text voting (50%) by hurados (50%) and the audience (called madlang people). The judges may still use the gong on a contender in this round.

Then, the two semifinalists with the highest combined score from the judges, and the public at the end of the six days move on to the grand finals (known as Ang Huling Tapatan) and receive  and a gold medal.

In the fourth season of the New Normal, the three semifinalists with the highest combined scores will receive .

Global Semifinals 
In addition to the four semifinals, an additional semifinal is held for overseas contenders. The semifinalists compete for additional two spots in the grand finals.

Wildcard rounds

Instant Resbak
In the third season, every judge is given the power to save one losing defending champion in the face-off round. The saved contender advances to compete in the Instant Resbak for a chance to re-enter the competition as a grand finalist. The judges may still use the gong on a contender in this round.

Ultimate Resbak
Semifinalists who failed to advance to the grand finals advance to the Ultimate Resbak round for a chance to re-enter the competition as a grand finalist. The judges may still use the gong on a contender in this round.

In the first season, the semifinalists are grouped into four and must compete in two rounds. In the first round, a group performs with individual songs. The semifinalists with the highest combined scores from the judges, and the public for each group will advance to the second round. In the second round, the four remaining semifinalists perform again with individual songs. The two contenders garnering the highest combined scores from the judges and the public advance to the grand finals.

In the second and third seasons, the Ultimate Resbak round follows a last man standing format. Two semifinalists who are in the Seat of Power choose two semifinalists. These chosen semifinalists battle it out for a chance to challenge and dethrone the sitting semifinalists. If the challenger wins, the semifinalist in the Seat of Power is dethroned. If the semifinalist in the Seat of Power wins, they remain in their seat. This continues until there are only two semifinalists left.

Final Resbak 
In the third season, Tawag ng Tanghalan introduced the Final Resbak. This round allows finalists who lose from the Instant and Ultimate Resbak rounds to compete for the final spot in the Grand Finals. The judges may still use the gong on a contender in this round.

Resbakbakan 
In the fourth season, three weeks of wildcard rounds were introduced. Quarter Finalists (Week 1), Weekly Finalists and one defending champion from Quarter 1 saved by the judges (Week 2), and Semi Finalists (Week 3) competed for a slot in the Grand Finals.

There is only one Seat of Power for each week. On the first day, the contender that will sit on the Seat of Power will be determined by draw lots. The resbaker will pick two contenders for a three-way battle. On the next episodes, the Seat of Power holder has an option to pass and pick two contenders who will perform against the Top 2 contender on the previous episode or to continue and pick only one contender for a three-way battle. The judges may still use the gong on a contender in this round.

If a resbaker wins for three consecutive days, they will have an additional . The last Seat of Power holder will proceed to the Grand Finals and received an additional .

In the sixth season, the resbakers will perform their redemption songs on the first two days. The Top 6 Resbakers will perform for two rounds on the third day and the Top 3 Resbakers will get the chance to advance in the second round to get the Top 2 spots for the Ultimate Resbak Round.

Grand Finals 
The finalists compete in the week-long grand finals, dubbed as The Final Face-off (or Ang Huling Tapatan), through a series of rounds. The finalist (or finalists) with the highest combined scores from the judges, and the public for each round advances to the live finale. In the second and third seasons, the finalist (or finalists) with the lowest score for each round is also eliminated.

In the first and second seasons, the judges still used the gong on a contender in this round. This rule was discontinued in the third season.

In the live finale, the competition is divided into two parts. The six finalists sing their journey song in the first part. Then, the three finalists with the highest combined scores from the judges, and the public will move on to the second part, wherein they will sing a medley song by their chosen artist. The finalist with the highest score will be named the grand champion.

The weekday rounds are held in ABS-CBN Studio 3, while the live finales are usually held in a large venue.

Drama sa Tanghalan 

Drama sa Tanghalan was a parody of a soap opera that is aired live within the "Tawag ng Tanghalan" segment of the Filipino noontime variety show It's Showtime on ABS-CBN in the Philippines and worldwide through The Filipino Channel. The mini-show, focuses on the comedic sketch of Vice Ganda, Vhong Navarro, Anne Curtis and Jhong Hilario. Drama sa Tanghalan has elements of comedy drama, parody, romantic comedy and reality television. The name "Drama sa Tanghalan" was coined by Jhong Hilario, one of the co-hosts of It's Showtime, to refer to the name of the primary segment.

Overview
The show follows the romantic-comedy love story of Romeo and Juliet. But there is a woman who blocks their relationship and her name is Aning. She is a beauty queen who won the title "Mutya ng Bunganga ng Bulkan 2016". The appearance of other characters like the father of Romeo and Juliet make things even more brighter and funnier.

Characters

Romeo, played by Vhong Navarro
 Romeo is the male protagonist of the series and is the fictionalized version of actor/dancer Vhong Navarro. He is the son of Rey Valera in the series. He is the love interest of Juliet.

Juliet, played by Vice Ganda
 Juliet is the female protagonist of the series and the love interest of Romeo. In the series, her father is Louie Ocampo.

Aning, played by Anne Curtis
 Aning is the main female antagonist in the story. She is the barrier on the relationship of the two. She always insisted that she is Romeo's one true love, but Juliet never believed.

Jhong, played by Jhong Hilario
 Jhong is Juliet's first love. He is always ignored by the three and he only join the skit once or twice a week.

Supporting Characters

Rey Val, played by Rey Valera
 He is the father of Romeo. He died in asthma with hiccup.

Louie, played by Louie Ocampo
 He is the father of Juliet.

Ryan, played by Ryan Bang
 He was considered by Romeo as his brother, a friend but later as a traitor and a rival after Ryan's confession of his long-time hidden feelings for Aning which was also Romeo's love interest.

Pasig Rayver, played by Ronnie Alonte
 He is considered as a former true romantic lover of Juliet. His name is comedically derived from the name of the Pasig River, which made the audience laugh when he first said his name on his first appearance.

Ratings
Drama sa Tanghalan proved to be a success in both broadcast television and social media. Since January 2016, It's Showtime dominated the noontime ratings. From 8%-10% in 2015, it boosted to 16%-20%, surpassing Eat Bulaga!'s 12%-14%. The comedy drama skit added excitement to the show as viewers are starting to love it resulting to good reviews and ratings.

Judges and hosts

Judges 
The judging panel is composed of a Head Judge (called as Punong Hurado) and four regular judges which was reduced to two regular judges since New Normal up to the current season.

Hosts 
Main hosts
 Vice Ganda
 Vhong Navarro
 Jhong Hilario
 Ogie Alcasid
 Kim Chiu
 Amy Perez-Castillo
 Anne Curtis
 Occasional hosts
 Ion Perez
 Jackque Gonzaga
 Karylle
Gong masters and co-hosts
 Ryan Bang
 Jhong Hilario
 Teddy Corpuz
 Jugs Jugueta 
 Ion Perez
Former main hosts
 Frankie Evangelista (1987–1988)
 Danny Javier (1987–1988)
 Nanette Inventor (1987–1988)
 Mariel Rodriguez-Padilla (2016–2019)
 James Reid (2017)
 Nadine Lustre (2017)
 Kim Atienza (2016–2020) 
Guest hosts
 Pia Wurtzbach
 Catriona Gray
 Iza Calzado
 Angel Locsin
 Maja Salvador
 Bela Padilla
 Yassi Pressman
 MC Calaquian
 Lassy Marquez 
 Ethel Booba
 Arci Muñoz
 Luis Manzano
 Alex Gonzaga
 Robi Domingo
 Billy Crawford
 Ana Ramsey

TNT Band 
 Ahmir Sayson - Musical Director, and Piano
 Chuck Joson - Musical Director, Piano, and 1st Keyboard
 Janno Queyquep - Guitar 
 Naldy Rodriguez - 2nd Keyboard
 Rommel Dela Cruz - Bass Guitar
 Joseph Marco Concepcion - Drums
 Lindie Ponce Enrile Achacoso - Vocalist 1
 April Concepcion - Vocalist 2
 Anna Achacoso-Garaham - Vocalist 3

Season summary

Season 1 (2016–2017) 

The first season debuted on January 2, 2016. The season concluded on March 11, 2017, at the Newport Performing Arts Theater, Resorts World Manila in Pasay.

After more than a year, Noven Belleza of Visayas emerged as the grand champion. Sam Mangubat was declared as runner-up, while Froilan Canlas finished at third place.

Kids (2017) 

Tawag ng Tanghalan Kids is a special edition for contenders ages 7 to 13. Auditions were held on December 4, 2016. The season premiered on March 13, 2017, with the additions of Jed Madela and Jolina Magdangal to the judging panel. Yeng Constantino served as the Head Judge for this season. The season concluded on June 10, 2017, at ABS-CBN Studio 3.

Keifer Sanchez of Mindanao was declared second placer, while Mackie Empuerto of Luzon finished at third place.

Season 2 (2017–2018) 

The second season premiered on June 12, 2017. For this season, the competition was also opened for global Filipino contenders from different parts of the world. Rey Valera returned as Head Judge, while Gary Valenciano was added to the judging panel. The season concluded on June 2, 2018, at Aliw Theater in Pasay.

Ato Arman of Mindanao was declared as second placer, while Steven Paysu of North America finished at third place.

Season 3 (2018–2019) 

The third season premiered on June 25, 2018. The competition's 1975 champion Dulce, Randy Santiago and Zsa Zsa Padilla were added to the judging panel. The season concluded on September 28, 2019, at the Caloocan Sports Complex in Bagumbong, Caloocan.

Elaine Duran of Mindanao, the first TNT record holder, emerged as the third grand champion, receiving an ultimate family vacation package to Bali, Indonesia from Gingerbon, custom in-ear monitors from FlipEars, business franchise from Potato Giant, talent management contract from ABS-CBN and TNTV, recording contract from TNT Records, a brand new house and lot from Camella, a trophy and ₱2,000,000. John Mark Saga of Luzon, the second TNT record holder, was declared as second placer, while John Michael dela Cerna of Mindanao finished at third place.

Celebrity Champions (2019) 

Tawag ng Tanghalan: Celebrity Champions is a celebrity edition aired on October 7, 2019, as part of the month-long celebration of It's Showtime's 10th anniversary. The season concluded on November 9, 2019, at ABS-CBN Studio 3.

Jason Fernandez and Roxanne Barcelo finished second and third place, respectively.

All-Star Grand Resbak (2019) 

TNT All-Star Grand Resbak is a special edition for contenders from past seasons who failed to advance to the grand finals. It premiered on November 11, 2019 and concluded on December 21, 2019, at ABS-CBN Studio 3.

Jex De Castro of Metro Manila, Sofronio Vasquez III  of Mindanao and Julius Cawaling of Luzon finished at second, third and fourth place, respectively.

Season 4 (2020–2021) 

The fourth season premiered on January 4, 2020. Pilita Corrales was added to the panel of judges this season. On March 15, 2020, the season was put on hiatus due to the lockdown caused by the COVID-19 pandemic in the Philippines and ABS-CBN's shutdown on May 5, 2020. The season was resumed on June 13, 2020, after 3 months since the lockdown in Luzon started and ABS-CBN's shutdown on May 5, 2020. This season was be halted from twice due to COVID-19 pandemic: on July 15, 2020, the season was halted due to the 14-day quarantine caused by one of the staff testing positive for the coronavirus and returned on August 1, 2020, and on August 5, 2020, the season was halted again due to the 2-week modified enhanced community quarantine (MECQ) and returned again on August 15, 2020. The season concluded on February 6, 2021, at ABS-CBN Studio 10 (ASAP Studio) in Quezon City.

JM Yosures of Metro Manila became the grand champion of the season. His prizes include , management contract from Star Magic, recording contract from Star Music, trophy made by Toym Imao, and a brand new house and lot from Lessandra. Rachell Laylo of Luzon and Ayegee Paredes of Mindanao placed second and third respectively.

Season 5 (2021) 

The fifth season premiered on February 8, 2021. On March 16, 2021, Vice Ganda announced that the show will move to a new studio at ABS-CBN Soundstage at San Jose del Monte, Bulacan soon. From March 18 to April 10, 2021, the season was halted because ABS-CBN decided to temporarily stop holding daily live programs due to the surge of COVID-19 cases in the Greater Manila Area. The season was resumed on April 12, 2021. Angeline Quinto, who was originally a guest judge in the previous season, became a regular judge after a successful guesting stint as a TNT Hurado. On June 28, 2021, Klarisse de Guzman joined the judging panel. The season concluded on September 18, 2021, at the It's Showtime Studio.

Reiven Umali of Luzon became the grand champion of the season that spanned for seven months. His prizes include , management contract from Star Magic, recording contract from Star Music, a trophy made by Toym Imao, and a brand new house and lot from Camella. Adrian Manibale and Anthony Castillo who was both from Metro Manila placed second and third respectively.

Season 6 (2021–present)

The sixth season premiered on November 22, 2021. From January 6 to 15, 2022, the season was halted because they decided to temporarily stop to daily live productions due to the surge of COVID-19. The season resumed on January 17, 2022.

Controversies and criticisms

Season 1 

Rey Valera has often as a judge been criticized by viewers and critics alike for his offensive comments to contestants about their physical appearance. He has received backlash on the internet for repeated incidents of body-shaming several female contestants and failing to focus on the contestants' singing skills.

Karla Estrada's qualification as a judge has also been questioned by some viewers.

Judges' scores and text voting results are also questioned by many viewers either for lack of transparency, a faulty system that fails to confirm their votes thru SMS, allegations of unfair judging and similar claims that the show is rigged.

In the 2017 Grand Final, acclaimed actress Nora Aunor, the original Tawag ng Tanghalan Grand Champion in 1968, was scheduled to be the special judge but pulled out at the last minute due to a conflict with Vice Ganda, one of the main hosts of the show. According to reports, Aunor believed Ganda's brand of insult comedy was against her moral beliefs and made her deeply uncomfortable with the idea of being on the show.

Season 2 

On May 22, 2018, in the Ultimate Resbak rounds, after the first round of songs between Ato Arman and Aila Santos, Ato Arman advanced to the second round. However, there has been negative criticisms against Hurado Jaya. Vice Ganda defended Jaya, and stated that she was one of the two hurados that voted for Aila Santos.

Season 3 

Since 2018, Tawag ng Tanghalan is often mentioned as one of the factors for longer airtime of It's Showtime, which in turn led to subsequent delays for the afternoon and primetime programs of ABS-CBN.

One of the semifinalists of Quarter 4, Season 3, Shantal Cuizon, made a headline when she made a controversial post in Twitter saying "Composer ka lang" and "Hustisya." Later, after her public apology, it was deleted and deactivated her Twitter account for good.

On the September 11 episode, after the second round of songs between Mariane Osabel and Mariko Ledesma, Mariko took the seat of power, dethroning Mariane. But when the screen appeared where the split scoring was revealed (showing the public and judges scores), the viewers noticed that Mariane's score given by the judges was 16.50%, while Mariko received 50%. Due to the allegedly "rigged" results, netizens used #HustisyaParaKayMariane and it trended on Twitter, citing the expression, rants and sentiments over the score given by the judges.

On September 14, 2019, Hurado Dulce spoke out on the controversial result, which aired on September 11, 2019.

With the recent controversy of the alleged results, Mariane withdrew the opportunity to compete for the Final Resbak due to her health problem. Mariko, who was one of the finalists for the Huling Tapatan, also withdrew her slot due to the netizens backlash to her.

Revenue and commercial venues

TNT Versions 
In June 2017, Tawag ng Tanghalan debuted TNT Versions or TNTV, a YouTube channel featuring cover videos from its alumni and TNTNow, livestreams featuring OPM icons.

TNT Records 
In July 2018, Tawag ng Tanghalan launched its own record label TNT Records under the guidance of ABS-CBN and Star Music to create platforms for its alumni. Its first signed artists were the TNT Boys, Janine Berdin, Ato Arman, Eumee Capile, Froilan Canlas, Anton Antenorcruz, Arabelle Dela Cruz, Reggie Tortugo, Sheena Belarmino and Steven Paysu. Second season finalists JM Bales, Christian Bahaya and Sofronio Vasquez were also launched as COVE, while Lalaine Araña and Pauline Agupitan were introduced as Bukang Liwayway.

TNT Records has released the following singles:

Concerts 

Notes:
^  The concert was originally going to be held on April 23, 2019, but was moved due to unforeseen circumstances.

Accolades

Notes

References

External links
 Tawag ng Tanghalan (season 1)
 Tawag ng Tanghalan (seasons 2 & 3)
 Tawag ng Tanghalan Kids

 
It's Showtime (TV program)
ABS-CBN original programming
Philippine variety television shows
1950s Philippine television series
1960s Philippine television series
1970s Philippine television series
1980s Philippine television series
2020s Philippine television series
1954 Philippine television series debuts
1972 Philippine television series endings
1987 Philippine television series debuts
1988 Philippine television series endings
2016 Philippine television series debuts
Philippine music television series
Filipino-language television shows
Singing competitions